Jahnu is a hermit-king in Hinduism, belonging to the Chandravamsha dynasty. The son of King Ajamīḍha, Jahnu abdicates his kingdom in favour of his son, Balākāśva, or sometimes Ajaka, and retires to perform a penance. According to the Harivamsa, he is also the husband of Kāveri.

Legend

Curse on Ganga 
Jahnu's curse on the goddess Ganga is described in the Brahma Purana:

Descent of Ganga 
As prophesied, Jahnu appears in the legend of Ganga and Bhagiratha. When the goddess Ganga descended upon the earth after being released from Shiva's locks, her torrential waters wreaked havoc upon Jahnu's fields and penance. Angered by this, the great sage drank up all the Ganges' waters to punish her. Seeing this, the devas prayed to the sage to release Ganga, so that she could proceed on her mission to release the souls of the ancestors of Bhagiratha. Jahnu relented, and he released the Ganges from his ear. For this, the Ganges river is also known as Jahnavi, meaning "daughter of Jahnu".

References 

Rishis

Hindu mythology